Kumar Galhotra (born December 1965) is an Indian-American entrepreneur who leads Ford Blue, Ford's internal-combustion business. He previously served as the group vice president and president of Ford North America, from March 1, 2018. Before that, Galhotra was the group vice president of Lincoln (2014-2018) and chief marketing officer for Ford Motor Company (2017-2018). Previously he was Vice-President of Engineering at Ford Motor Co. He joined Ford in 2012 having worked for Mazda in Japan.

Galhotra completed his education at the University of Michigan–Dearborn, where he gained a bachelor of science in mechanical engineering.

References 

1965 births
Ford executives
American people of Indian descent
American businesspeople
Living people
University of Michigan–Dearborn alumni